The 2017 Clare Senior Football Championship was the 122nd staging of the Clare Senior Football Championship since its establishment by the Clare County Board in 1887.

The defending champions were Kilmurry-Ibrickane who had won their fourteenth overall title in 2016.

Senior Championship Fixtures/Results

First round
 Eight winners advance to Round 2A (winners)
 Eight losers move to Round 2B (Losers)

Second round

A. Winners
 Played by eight winners of Round 1
 Four winners advance to Quarter-finals
 Four losers move to Round 3

B. Losers
 Played by eight losers of Round 1
 Four winners move to Round 3

Third round
 Played by four losers of Round 2A & four winners of Round 2B
 Four winners advance to Quarter-finals

Quarter-finals
 Played by four winners of Round 2A and four winners of Round 3

Semi-finals

County Final

References

External links

Clare Senior Football Championship
Clare Senior Football Championship